Emperor Renzong of Western Xia (1124 – 16 October 1193), born Li Renxiao, was the fifth emperor of the Tangut-led Western Xia dynasty of China. His reign from 1139 to 1193 was the longest among all Western Xia emperors.

Li Renxiao was the eldest son of the Emperor Chongzong, and succeeded him at the age of sixteen. After ascending into the throne, Renzong made friendly overtures to the Jin dynasty. In domestic politics, Renzong created many schools and used examinations to choose his officials. He respected Confucianism, and built many temples worshipping Confucius. During the era of Tiansheng, Renzong hired a Tibetan lama as a religious advisor and printed many copies of Buddhist teachings.

In 1170, Renzong discovered a plot to kill him. He executed the generals who were behind the plot. As a result, Renzong distrusted his army generals and the army began to fall into incompetence. During his later years, Western Xia began to fight wars against various enemies.

Renzong's reign was the peak of Western Xia Dynasty. Many tribes to the north and west became vassal states of Western Xia, and Renzong's focus on internal politics allowed the central government to be more efficient. His reign coincides with the peak of the Southern Song and the Jin Dynasties, and there were relatively few conflicts between these three countries.

He died in 1193 having reigned for over half a century like his father before him.

Family 
Consorts and issue:

 Empress Wang (d. 1167/1168)
 Empress Zhangxianqinci (章獻欽慈皇后), of the Luo clan
Emperor Huanzong of Western Xia, Chunyou (西夏桓宗純祐), first son

Notes

References

1124 births
1193 deaths
Western Xia emperors
Chinese Buddhist monarchs
12th-century Chinese monarchs
12th-century Tangut rulers